Father, Dear Father is a British television sitcom produced by Thames Television for ITV from 1968 to 1973 starring Patrick Cargill. It was subsequently made into a spin-off film of the same title released in 1973.

An Australian sequel series of the same name (though usually referred to as Father, Dear Father in Australia to distinguish it from the UK original) followed in 1978. The same year a West German adaptation Oh, This Father starring Willy Millowitsch began, lasting until 1981.

Premise
The original series focused on divorced British novelist Patrick Glover (Patrick Cargill) and his daughters, Karen (Ann Holloway) and Anna (Natasha Pyne), a couple of lively girls in their teens. The family lives in Hampstead, London. Another member of the household is the girls' Nanny (Noel Dyson). As well as having to deal with his progeny, Patrick also faces frequent hassles with his ex-wife Barbara (Ursula Howells) and her current husband Bill Mossman (played by Patrick Holt, and later Tony Britton). There is also his brother Philip (Donald Sinden), his mother (Joyce Carey), his agent Georgie Thompson (Sally Bazely Series 1 and 2 and later Dawn Addams Series 4-7), his publisher Ian Smyth (Michael Segal in series 3) and his pet St. Bernard dog 'H. G. Wells'. At the end of the sixth series Anna marries Tim Tanner (Jeremy Child), who then became a regular in the last series.

Cast

 Patrick Cargill - Patrick Glover
 Natasha Pyne - Anna Glover
 Ann Holloway - Karen Glover 
 Noel Dyson - Nanny
 Dawn Addams - Georgie Thompson
 Ursula Howells - Barbara 
 Joyce Carey - Patrick’s mother 
 Sally Bazely - Georgie Thompson
Jeremy Child - Timothy Tanner
Tony Britton - Bill Mossman
Michael Segal - Ian Smythe
Patrick Holt - Bill Mossman
James Appleby - Milkman
Donald Sinden - Philip Glover
Richard O’Sullivan - Howard
Richard Wattis - Manager 
Ballard Berkeley - Colonel 
Beryl Reid - Miss Pretty
Elspet Gray - Doctor 
Robert Raglan - Mr Fletcher
John Clegg - Vicar
Joan Sims - Mrs Armitage
Melvyn Hayes - Les
June Whitfield - Mrs Parsons
Bill Pertwee - Mr Duffy

Episodes
Series 1 and 2 are in black & white. Series 3 to 7 are in colour.

Series 1 (1968)

Series 2 (1969)

Series 3 (1970)

Series 4 (1971)

Series 5 (1971)

Series 6 (1972)

Series 7 (1973)

Australian version

A few years after Karen and Anna have married and left home, Patrick decides to go to Australia to do some research for a book he is writing and takes Nanny along (both Cargill and Dyson reprised the roles). He intends to stay with his brother Jeffrey (Ron Frazer), but Jeffrey unexpectedly has to travel to London for 6 months in connection with his work. Jeffrey comments that he is worried about leaving his daughters, Liz (Sally Conabere) and Sue (Sigrid Thornton), to fend for themselves while he is away and asks if Patrick and Nanny can look after them, and Patrick begrudgingly agrees. Liz and Sue had been looking forward to being free of adult supervision while their father was away, so they're initially unimpressed with the idea. 'H.G.Wells' was replaced by two new St.Bernards, a dog named G.K. (after G.K. Chesterton) and a bitch named 'A.C.' (after Agatha Christie). Wallas Eaton appears in two episodes of the second series as Patrick's Australian publisher, Sam Winterton.

Two 7-episode series were made by Lyle McCabe Productions in association with the Seven Network; like the original, they were produced and directed by William G. Stewart. Gordon Franks' original title music was also re-used. Mortimer and Cooke wrote the first episode, "Once More With Feeling"; the rest of the episodes were written by writers such as Richard Waring and Donald Churchill.

Series 1 (1978)

Series 2 (1980)

DVD release
All seven series of Father, Dear Father (including the feature film) have been released on DVD by Network, A 7-disc box-set of the complete series has also been released. Both series of the Australian Father, Dear Father series have been released in a 2 disc set by Umbrella Entertainment in Australia.

See also
 List of films based on British sitcoms

References

External links

 Father, Dear Father - credits and episodes guide

1960s British sitcoms
1970s British sitcoms
1968 British television series debuts
1973 British television series endings
English-language television shows
ITV sitcoms
Television series by Fremantle (company)
Television shows produced by Thames Television
Television shows set in London
Television shows adapted into films
Television shows shot at Teddington Studios